Aasia Ishaque, (آسيه اسحاق) is a politician and businesswomen. Currently she is senior, active and a vocal leader of Pak Sarzameen Party (PSP) and known for her out right and blunt approach. Previously, she served as Secretary Information in All Pakistan Muslim League presided by Pervez Musharraf till 2014 and holds the position of Central Secretary of Information in (APML).

Family and background

Aasia was born on 20 August 1970 in metropolitan city of Karachi, Sindh, Pakistan. She is daughter of Mohammad Ishaque Siddiqui and belongs to an educated Muslim family, which migrated from Uttar Pradesh, India at the time of Indo-Pak partition.

Education

After secondary and higher secondary schooling in Karachi through Kulsoom Bai Valika Airport Model School and Government Degree Science College Malir Cantt, she pursued Bachelor of Pharmacy from University of Karachi.

Political career

Pakistan Tehreek-e-Insaf

Aasia initiated her political career in 2002 by joining Pakistan Tehreek-e-Insaf (PTI), contested National Assembly Elections in 2002 through General Seat and hold the Membership of CEC and Core Committee of PTI till 2006.

Pakistan League – Q

Joined Pakistan League – Q (PML-Q) in 2007, as General Secretary for Women Wing of Pakistan, CEC and CWC under the leadership of Chaudhry Shujaat Hussain and left in 2012.

All Pakistan Muslim League

Designated as Information Secretary of APML in 2012 and sustain the position till 2014, Furthermore, she is still Member of the Central Executive Committee (CEC) of APML.

Pak Sar Zameen Party

Joined Pak Sarzameen Party (PSP) as a founder member on 25 May 2016 and contributing her efforts to recognize the party at national level under the leadership of Syed Mustafa Kamal.

Ishaque spoke at the first all woman gathering for the local government elections in Karachi in 2020 organised by PSP.

References

1970 births
Living people
All Pakistan Muslim League politicians